The 2024 United States Senate election in Connecticut will be held on November 5, 2024, to elect a member of the United States Senate to represent the state of Connecticut. Incumbent two-term Democratic Senator Chris Murphy was re-elected with 59.5% of the vote in 2018.

Democratic primary

Candidates

Declared
Chris Murphy, incumbent U.S. Senator

Republican primary

Candidates

Potential
 Matthew Corey, businessman and nominee for this seat in 2018
 Dominic Rapini, businessman and candidate for this seat in 2018

General election

Predictions

References

External links
Official campaign websites 
Chris Murphy (D) for Senate

2024
Connecticut
United States Senate